The Mayor of Auckland is the directly elected head of the Auckland Council, the local government authority for the Auckland Region in New Zealand, which it controls as a unitary authority. The position exists since October 2010 after the amalgamation of various territorial authorities. The mayor is supported by a deputy mayor.

Background 
The position was first filled by election on 9 October 2010 for the establishment of the Auckland Council on 1 November 2010. The Council replaced seven territorial authority councils, including the Auckland City Council, and also the Auckland Regional Council. Before 2010, "Mayor of Auckland" was an informal term applied to the Mayor of Auckland City, head of the Auckland City Council.

Until October 2013, when new mayoral powers set out in the Local Government Act 2002 Amendment Act 2012 came into effect, the Mayor of Auckland had more powers compared to other mayors in New Zealand.

Role of mayor
The mayor has the powers to establish their own office, create and dissolve governing body committees and appoint the chairpersons of the council's committees. The mayor chairs the governing body and may exercise a casting vote if a tie arises during a vote.

History of mayoral contests 
In the first mayoral election for Auckland Council in 2010, outgoing Mayor of Manukau City Len Brown was elected, defeating outgoing Mayor of Auckland City John Banks, outgoing Mayor of North Shore City Andrew Williams and prominent Christian businessman Colin Craig, amongst others. The mayoral office had a budget of $4.1 million and a staff of 18 in 2011. Brown preferred not to use the honorific "His Worship".

Contenders in the 2013 Auckland mayoral election included Brown, John Minto and John Palino. Brown was re-elected.

Brown announced in November 2015 that he would not contest the 2016 mayoralty election. There were 19 contenders for the position, and Phil Goff won against Victoria Crone, John Palino, and Chlöe Swarbrick.

In the 2019 mayoral election, Goff won re-election against 21 contenders with 49% of the vote. Other contenders who received a high share of the vote include John Tamihere (22%), Craig Lord (8%), John Hong (4%) and Ted Johnston (4%).

List of mayors

Role of deputy mayor
The deputy mayor is the second highest elected official in the Auckland Council. The deputy mayor acts in support of the Mayor of Auckland. It is the second highest elected position in the council. However, like the position of Deputy Prime Minister, this seniority does not necessarily translate into power. They are appointed by the mayor from the elected ward councillors. The current deputy mayor is Desley Simpson, who represents the Ōrākei ward on the Auckland Council. Simpson was selected to be deputy by incoming mayor Wayne Brown.

Beyond committees of the whole council, the deputy mayor is an ex-officio member of the following Auckland Council committees:
 Performance and Appointments Committee
 Audit and Risk Committee
 Civil Defence & Emergency Management Committee
 Community Development and Safety Committee
 Council-Controlled Organisation Direction and Oversight Committee
 Expenditure Control and Procurement Committee
 Regulatory and Safety Committee
 Auckland Domain Committee
Like any other councillor, the deputy mayor may be appointed to additional committees which the mayor wishes to appoint them to.

List of deputy mayors

References

Auckland
 Mayor of Auckland
Politics of the Auckland Region
Auckland Council